An endangered language is a language that it is at risk of falling out of use, generally because it has few surviving speakers. If it loses all of its native speakers, it becomes an extinct language. UNESCO defines four levels of language endangerment between "safe" (not endangered) and "extinct":
 Vulnerable
 Definitely endangered
 Severely endangered
 Critically endangered

North America is a continent in the Earth's northern hemisphere and (chiefly) western hemisphere. It is bordered on the north by the Arctic Ocean, on the east by the North Atlantic Ocean, on the southeast by the Caribbean Sea, and on the south and west by the North Pacific Ocean; South America lies to the southeast. It covers an area of about 24,709,000 square kilometres (9,540,000 sq mi), about 4.8% of the planet's surface or about 16.5% of its land area. As of July 2007, its population was estimated at nearly 524 million people.

Today, North America only has a total of 256 living languages. However, out of those 256 languages, 238 are in the realm of extinction. That is, 92% of languages that are dying. The United States has the highest number of dying languages, 143 out of 219 languages, then Canada with 75 dying out of its 94 languages, and lastly, Greenland has the smallest number, nil of its two spoken languages.

Canada

United States

Notes

North America
Endangered languages
North America
Indigenous peoples in Canada-related lists
Native American-related lists